Coron, officially the Municipality of Coron,  is a 1st class municipality in the province of Palawan, Philippines. According to the 2020 census, it has a population of 65,855 people.

The main population center of the municipality is composed of Poblacion barangays 1 to 6, where the Municipal Building, the Municipal Legislative Building, and the Judicial Hall of the Municipal Circuit Trial Court are located. Its fiesta is held annually on August 28 in honor of Saint Augustine. It is the commercial capital of the Calamian Islands.

The municipality is home to the Coron Island Natural Biotic Area, which is listed in the natural category of the UNESCO World Heritage Tentative List.

History
The Calamianes Islands were originally inhabited by the Tagbanuas, Calmiananen, and Cuyonon tribes.

Oral history tells that the Datu Macanas ruled the entire Busuanga Island where present-day Coron town lies. Early on Spanish exploration of the islands, Fray de la Concepcion took note of the friendliness of the people of Busuanga Island and the ferocity of the Tagbanua tribe living in Coron Island.

In this area of the Calamianes, the first permanent Spanish settlement was Culion. Coron was a mere visita of Culion at that time. A fort and church were built in Libis, Culion around 1670 by the Spaniards as part of the defenses (along with Cuyo, Taytay, and Linapacan) against the Muslim raids. This became a settlement for migrants to the Calamianes. Don Nicolas Manlavi a Cuyonon served several years in Spanish Galleons, and an Ilonggo from Jaro, Ilo-ilo named Claudio Sandoval later wed Nicolas' only daughter Evarista. The Sandoval clan of the Calamianes came from this union. It was Don Nicolas Manlavi who established the first settlement in Coron which was initially at Banuang Lague (old town) in present-day Banuang Daan in Coron Island. The town center was then again moved to present-day Maquinit and later on, it was finally established in present-day Bancuang in Barangay 5 where a good water source was found.  

Late in the 1890s, an American naturalist, Dean Worcester, journeyed through the Calamianes collecting specimens and stayed briefly in Culion. At the turn of the century, he was appointed part of the First Philippine Commission, becoming the Secretary of the Interior. He recommended Culion as the Philippine Leper Colony. This act forced the transfer of the Sandoval clan in 1900 to the various barrios of what is now Coron and Busuanga. The Coron town was settled by the family of Claudio Sandoval, and the other Sandovals settled in what is now Bintuan, Salvacion, Concepcion, and Old Busuanga.

In 1950, the town of Busuanga was created from the barrios of Concepcion, Salvacion, Busuanga, New Busuanga, Buluang, Quezon, Calawit, and Cheey which used to belong to Coron. In 1954, the islands of Linapacan, Cabunlaoan, Niangalao, Decabayotot, Calibanbangan, Pical, and Barangonan were separated from Coron to form the town of Linapacan.

Geography
The municipality of Busuanga comprises the western part of Busuanga Island, while Coron comprises the eastern part of Busuanga Island, all of Coron Island and about 50 other minor islets stretching as far as Tara Island in the north-east and Canipo Island in the south.  All these islands are part of the Calamian Archipelago in northern Palawan that separates the South China Sea from the Sulu Sea.

Barangays
Coron is politically subdivided into 23 barangays.

Climate

Demographics

Economy

The main industries of Coron are fishing and tourism. Former industries include manganese mining at Singay Mines in Barangay San Nicolas during the Japanese Occupation period. This was followed by the fishing industry boom during the 1970s up to the 1990s which gradually dwindled due to illegal blast and sodium cyanide fishing. The rattan and basket-weaving industry which also gradually declined during the same period due to the ensuing depletion of raw materials.

Currently tourism is the top industry in Coron due to local beaches, dive sites, and other natural tourist spots. A description of the diving highlights in 2021 is provided by Dive the World.

Transportation
The Francisco B. Reyes Airport serves the town.

Gallery

References

External links

 [ Philippine Standard Geographic Code]
Local Governance Performance Management System
Philippine Department of Tourism official site

Municipalities of Palawan
Port cities and towns in the Philippines
Beaches of the Philippines
Underwater diving sites in the Philippines